Qinar, also known as Qiz, may refer to:
 Qinar-e Olya
 Qinar-e Sofla